Barbara Jane Ingram (February 9, 1947  – October 20, 1994) was an American R&B singer and songwriter who was active throughout the early 1970s until the mid-late 1980s, enjoying modest success as a backup singer for almost two decades.

Career
In 1972, Ingram formed a vocal trio with her cousin Carla Benson and Benson's close friend, Evette Benton, alternating with group names such as: "The Sweethearts of Sigma", "The Philadelphia Angels", "The Sweeties" and "The Sweethearts". The trio can be heard on many Contemporary R&B/Disco albums recorded in Philadelphia.

In 1971, she sang background vocals, alongside songwriter Linda Creed, on The Stylistics eponymous album, reappearing on their 1973 successor album, Rockin' Roll Baby.

In 1973 and 1974, Ingram appeared on Hawaiian based soul singer Dick Jensen’s eponymous debut album, followed by R&B/Soul band Ecstasy, Passion & Pain's eponymous debut album.

Through the decade of the 1970s, Ingram, Benson and Benton comprised the in-house backup group for Philadelphia International Records, known as the Sweethearts of Sigma.  They worked for producer and Philadelphia soul co-creator Thom Bell, as well as backing a number of acts that came through to record in the closely related Sigma Sound Studios. The trio can be heard on a number of hits, such as The Spinners’ million-sellers "Could It Be I'm Falling in Love" (1972) and "Games People Play" (1975).

Later life
In 1976 Ingram sang lead vocals on the album The Funk Is In Our Music for the Ingram Kingdom, a family group that included her five brothers James [Jimmy], Norman [Butch], William [Billy], Robert [Timmy] and John [Johnny]. Switching their name to 'Ingram' in 1977, Barbara continued to contribute background vocals to the group's next three albums released 1977-1984, That's All!, Would You Like To Fly and Night Stalkers. Ingram is pictured on their first album Ingram Kingdom.

Throughout the years, from 1975 until 1985 she sang backup for The Salsoul Orchestra, Grace Jones, Cat Stevens, The Spinners, Eddie Kendricks, Major Harris, Cindy Williams, Phyllis Hyman, Double Exposure, Billy Paul, Loleatta Holloway, Evelyn King, Philippé Wynne, Dick Jensen, Claudja Barry, Elkie Brooks, Lou Rawls, Brenda Mitchell, The Trammps, Stevie Wonder, Marvin Gaye, Luther Vandross, Sister Sledge, Dexter Wansel, among others for their albums.

Ingram continued to sing live concert shows from 1980 until 1986, then from 1988 until 1992.

Personal life and death
Ingram was married to songwriter/producer Sherman Marshall, who wrote famous 1970s hits such as "I'm Doin' Fine Now" by New York City,  "Then Came You" by the Spinners and "Lady Love" by Lou Rawls. Ingram also had a daughter named Denene.

On October 20, 1994, Barbara Ingram died at the age of 47, in Camden, New Jersey. According to the book, A House on Fire: The Rise and Fall of Philadelphia Soul by John A. Jackson, Ingram suffered from both lupus, and cancer. The funeral was held in her hometown of Camden. Her husband and daughter both preceded her in death.

References

External links
An interview with Carla Benson at Soul Express in December 2014
Find A Grave Barbara Jane Ingram Marshall Find A Grave Memorial# 99017771

1947 births
1994 deaths
Musicians from Camden, New Jersey
20th-century American singers
20th-century American women singers